Marius Gallottini (10 November 1904 – 3 October 2001) was an Italian racing cyclist. He rode in the 1927 Tour de France.

References

External links
 

1904 births
2001 deaths
Italian male cyclists
Place of birth missing
Cyclists from Turin